"Samantha" is the ninth single from Japanese pop singer Kaela Kimura.  It reached number 8 on the Oricon charts.

Track listing
"Samantha"
"Honey B~Mitsubachi Dance"
"Samantha" (instrumental)
"Honey B~Mitsubachi Dance" (instrumental)

References

2007 singles
Kaela Kimura songs
Japanese-language songs
Songs written by Kaela Kimura
2007 songs